Texas State Highway 141 (SH 141) is a Texas state highway in Jim Wells and Kleberg counties.

Route description
The western terminus of SH 141 is at  US 281 (Future I-69C) in Jim Wells County; the continuation past US 281 to Benavides is designated  FM 2295. The route travels east into Kleberg County and into the city of Kingsville, where it ends at  US 77 (Future I-69E).

History
SH 141 was originally designated on September 18, 1929 from Kingsville west to Benavides,  but was shortened to its current route on July 15, 1935. The designation was extended slightly to the east, to the bypass of US 77 in Kingsville, on June 26, 1962.

Major intersections

References

141
Transportation in Jim Wells County, Texas
Transportation in Kleberg County, Texas